In horse racing, a chute is an extended path increasing the length of a straight portion of a racecourse, particularly an oval-shaped one, allowing races of a specified distance to start at a location other than on one of the turns.

For example, many racetracks in the United States are exactly  in circumference; often such racetracks are symmetrical ovals, with both straightaways and both turns being precisely  of a mile (402 m). Frequently, the finish line will be positioned exactly three-quarters of the way down the stretch; in that case, the point at which the first or "clubhouse" turn joins to the backstretch would be 5 furlongs (1,106 m) from the finish. In order to hold races at the distance of  – the most common distance of American thoroughbred horse races – the backstretch is extended by an extra 1/16 of a mile (101 m). This is the most common situation where a chute is pressed into service.

This diagonal chute can either consist of a more-or-less straight line, or may curve significantly, in a counterclockwise direction. In 2006 two tracks — Monmouth Park and Hollywood Park Racetrack — added a chute extending diagonally from the backstretch, to permit races at  furlongs and 6 furlongs, respectively (the corresponding circumferences of these two tracks' turf courses being 7 furlongs and 1 mile plus 145 feet).

Hollywood's chute formerly allowed  races, but when its finish line was moved forward in the late 1980s  races could no longer be accommodated, and  became the longest distance that could be run out of its chute (an unintended consequence of this was that by the mid-2000s -furlong [1,509 m] dirt races had gained considerable popularity in the United States when such races had rarely if ever been run before at most tracks, even those where the track's configuration made it possible to do so).

Rarely, a "half-chute" will be employed; in this instance, the chute will branch off from a turn, usually the clubhouse turn, at the midway point of the turn, and extend to a position level with that of the homestretch, the chute thus joining to the turn at a 90-degree angle. Currently only one racetrack of note in the United States — Ellis Park Racecourse in Kentucky — makes use of such a chute, starting races from it at the distance of one mile (Ellis Park is a 1 mile [1,811 m] track). Formerly, Saratoga also had such a chute; it was known as the "Wilson Mile" chute, and like the one found at Ellis Park, it was used to start  races. The "all-weather" (dirt) track at England's Wolverhampton Racecourse has a similar chute, but it is used for 7-furlong races as the latter is a one-mile (1.6 km) track. The one-mile dirt oval at Tampa Bay Downs in Oldsmar, Florida also once had a similar chute which permitted races at 7 furlongs; however, this chute extended diagonally from the backstretch and not on a 90-degree angle. In 2004 Tampa Bay Downs' backstretch chute was lengthened to 7 furlongs, whereupon the diagonal chute was decommissioned; however, remnants of it are still intact. Laurel Park in Maryland also formerly had a diagonal chute, which allowed for races at up to 1 miles.

Perhaps America's most distinctive horse racing chute is the El Camino Real Chute, located at Santa Anita. Added in 1953, this is a downhill turf chute consisting of a straight section, a right turn (unique in modern American horse racing), another straight section, and a long, sweeping left turn, before finally crossing over the dirt course and joining the turf oval. The chute was modeled to give the appearance of a European-type course. Grass sprints at about 6 furlongs (actual distance 64 feet less than same), as well as the marathon distance of about 1 miles (actual distance 262 feet less than same, and generally used only once a year for the San Juan Capistrano Invitational race), utilize the full length of the El Camino Real Chute. Turf races at 1 miles and 1 miles also start from various points within the chute, and races at 1 miles (a very common turf distance at American tracks) start directly on the dirt crossover. At 1 miles and longer, the horses are then required to go once around Santa Anita's turf oval, which is somewhat larger and narrower than most turf courses situated inside one-mile dirt tracks (9/10ths of a mile, or 7 furlongs plus 132 feet; this is also the case at Golden Gate Fields racetrack in Albany, California).

Horse racing terminology